Georges Andriques (November 2nd 1874 – 1964) was a French Impressionist painter. He was born and died in Calais . He largely painted in oils but also worked with watercolours. Andrique produced a number of posters including advertisements for the port of Calais. He remains relatively unknown, partly as a result of a significant body of his work being destroyed in a fire in the 1940s.

He was awarded the Chevalier de la Légion d'honneur in 1962.

References 

1874 births
1964 deaths
People from Calais
19th-century French painters
19th-century French male artists
French male painters
20th-century French painters
20th-century French male artists
French Impressionist painters
Chevaliers of the Légion d'honneur